Roland Vantyne (1887 - November 26, 1938) was an American architect. He attended the Buffalo Polytechnic Institute, and he was a draftsman for Albert Held and Julius Zittel. He co-founded a firm with Archibald G. Rigg in 1919, and they designed the Shriner's Hospital and Hutton Elementary School in Spokane. They designed at least two buildings listed on the National Register of Historic Places: the Red Shield Inn (now known as Lewis Army Museum) in Fort Lewis, Washington, and the First Presbyterian Church of Whitefish in Montana. Vantyne was a Rosicrucian.

References

1887 births
1938 deaths
People from Spokane, Washington
Architects from Washington (state)
20th-century American architects